The Black Major (published name John Shepherd) is a fictional character from the Action Force series depicted in the Battle Action Force comic books and Palitoy action figures as a European version of G.I. Joe.

In West Germany, he was known as the Schwarzer Major.

Characterisation
The Black Major was depicted in the Battle Action Force comic book series as a member of the Red Shadows and second-in-command to Baron Ironblood.

Limited information is given in to his background on the file cards that accompanied the action figure although it is variously believed that he was either a traitor from Action Force (as a former British Special Boat Service marine commando) or was otherwise a captive of Baron Ironblood, subsequently brainwashed into: a dedicated and ruthless follower. Brilliant military commander and tactician. Totally emotionless. The Black Major carries out Baron Ironblood's orders without question.

His primary military specialty is stated as Combat Control though all other information is classed as Classified. However, his real name is referred to a number of times in his extensive back story.

Court martialled in absentia by his former Royal Marine unit and disowned by his family following his treachery, his name is derived from the Spanish phrase el comandante negro, which was shouted at him by Andean soldiers in his first engagement for the Red Shadows.

Graphic representation
The figure is a repaint of the Action Force commander (a figure only available via a mail-in offer), giving some weight to his characterisation as a former Action Force member.

The figure was provided with an AK-47 assault rifle and a red paper codebook. Using the codebook one was able to decipher the characters used on Red Shadow vehicles (such as Shadowtrak), decals and armour as well as occasional Red Shadow wording used in the comic books.

Transition to Cobra
The Black Major was one of the key characters retained in the storylines surrounding the transition from the Red Shadows to Cobra. The evolution of both the action figures and the comic strip to conform to G. I. Joe in the mid-1980s saw a storyline where Ironblood betrayed the Red Shadows, leaking information about their bases and intentions to the UN. As the Shadows were wiped out, Ironblood constructed a new identity for himself, becoming Cobra Commander, and creating Cobra as a new enemy force.

While Red Jackal sought his own revenge and instead became Destro, the Black Major, Red Laser and Red Vulture stuck together and went in search of Cobra Commander. The Major finally confronted him at gunpoint during a battle with Action Force. He was taken aback when Cobra Commander addressed him by his real name of "Shepherd" and was even more surprised to recognise his voice as Ironblood's. He dropped his guard long enough for Cobra Commander to squirt him with cobra venom from a ring on his finger. He was rescued by Red Laser and Red Vulture.

Determined on revenge, the Black Major now led his own group of surviving Red Shadows and fought his own war against Cobra, independent of Action Force. The Major's next appearance in Battle Action Force was in Showdown for the Shadows, in which he sought one final counter-attack against the combined AF forces. The Black Major escaped with a fortune in valuables.

On another occasion, he destroyed the so-called School for Snakes where Cobra had assembled child prodigies from all over the world and brainwashed them into serving Cobra Commander. A chance encounter with Destro lead to them plotting to assassinate Cobra Commander, though this truce was short-lived.

His final appearance was in the Battle Action Force Annual 1987 Storm Shadow story where, acting upon a tip-off, Cobra Commander dispatched Storm Shadow to eliminate the Black Major. He barely escaped with his life and was not heard from again.

In 2010, the Red Shadows were the main adversary featured in the Official G.I. Joe Collectors' Club Convention Set. The set featured a new, G.I. Joe-style version of the Black Major as one of the figures in the set, and the file card information stated that the Black Major was in charge of the Red Shadows.

In 2013 The Black Major and his Red Shadows returned in the IDW G.I.Joe comic book. They had allied themselves with Cobra forces to gain influence over the ruler of a small country. The Major quickly betrayed his allies when the G.I.Joe team attacked. His Red Shadows were either slain or captured.

References

Action Force characters
Fictional British people
Fictional commanders
Fictional Royal Marines personnel
Fictional Special Boat Service personnel
Fictional mass murderers
Fictional private military members